Burwood Heights is a suburb in the Inner West of Sydney, in the state of New South Wales, Australia. It is located 10 kilometres west of the Sydney central business district and is situated within the local government area of Municipality of Burwood.

Burwood Heights is a residential suburb with no shops, schools or any public buildings. The postcode is 2136, the same as neighbouring Enfield. Burwood is a separate suburb, to the north.

History
The Geographical Names Board of New South Wales assigned Burwood Heights the status of a separate suburb on 19 January 2007.

Population
According to the 2016 census of Population, there were 989 residents in Burwood Heights. 51.7% of people were born in Australia. The next most common country of birth was China (excludes SARs and Taiwan) at 13.4%. 38.7% of people spoke only English at home. Other languages spoken at home included Mandarin 12.6% and Italian 10.1%. The most common responses for religion were Catholic 33.8% and No Religion 24.3%.

References

Suburbs of Sydney
Municipality of Burwood